Ryan Vierra (born August 23, 1968) is a world champion Highland Games competitor. Ryan is a 5-time winner of the World Highland Games Championships, he is also an 11 time US National Champion. Ryan has set 346 Games records, 4 World records, 10 North American & American records and 6 World Championship records.

Professional Records
16 lbs Open Stone		
17 lbs Open Stone	.	
22 lbs Braemar Stone	.
26 lbs Braemar Stone	.	
16 lbs Hammer Throw    .
22 lbs Hammer Throw	.
28 lbs for Distance	93 ft.
56 lbs for Distance	49.2 ft.
16 lbs Sheaf Toss	.	
20 lbs Sheaf Toss	.	
56 lbs Weight for Height 16.0 st.(18.0 1 sp)
Caber Toss ( 23' × l30lbs) 12:00×2

Strongman Events
Donanun Stones for time	21.4 sec	
98 lbs Stone for distance	.	
125 lbs Stone for distance	.	
Flint Stone (Press Overhead)	374 lbs.

Personal Records
Power Clean: 385 
Power Snatch: 245 pounds (Stopped going heavy in 1992)
Jerk: 374lbs
Squat: 640 pounds (for a double -just knee raps and a belt)

Jump Shrugs: 600×2
Deadlift: 535 pounds (Stopped after High School, 1986)
Bench Press: 410 pounds

Career Wins
1st place - 254
2nd place - 60
3rd place - 19
4th place - 6
5th place - 4
7th place - 1

References

American strength athletes
1968 births
Living people